Bryan John Leighton (born December 1996) is an English former first-class cricketer.

Leighton was born at Hereford. He later studied at the Saïd Business School at the University of Oxford. While studying at Oxford, he made a single appearance in first-class cricket for Oxford University against Cambridge University in The University Match at Oxford in 2018. Playing as a right-arm medium pace bowler, he took the wickets of Darshan Chohan and Danny Murty in the Cambridge first innings, while in their second innings he took the wicket of Murty once again to claim match figures of 3 for 79.

References

External links

1996 births
Living people
People from Hereford
Alumni of Saïd Business School
English cricketers
Oxford University cricketers